Tinka Dančević (born March 20, 1980 in Zagreb) is a retired butterfly swimmer from Croatia, who twice competed for her native country in the women's 200 metre butterfly event at the Summer Olympics: in 1996 and 2000.

References
 sports-reference

1980 births
Living people
Croatian female butterfly swimmers
Olympic swimmers of Croatia
Swimmers at the 1996 Summer Olympics
Swimmers at the 2000 Summer Olympics
Swimmers from Zagreb
20th-century Croatian women
21st-century Croatian women